Julien Peudecoeur (born 7 December 1981) is a French rower. He competed in the men's eight event at the 2004 Summer Olympics.

References

1981 births
Living people
French male rowers
Olympic rowers of France
Rowers at the 2004 Summer Olympics
People from Pont-à-Mousson
Sportspeople from Meurthe-et-Moselle